Wells-next-the-Sea Lifeboat Station is a lifeboat station in the town of Wells-next-the-Sea in the English county of Norfolk. The station, run by the Royal National Lifeboat Institution, operates both inshore and offshore lifeboats. The inshore boat is called  and is a  lifeboat, whilst the offshore boat is called ,
and is a Mersey class lifeboat. The station boathouse is located at the beach on the western side of Wells Harbour mouth.

History

1800s: earliest rescue services 
Early sea rescues in Wells were performed by private citizens who often attempted to use their rescue efforts to claim salvage rights to the rescued vessel for their own profit. The first organised rescue service at Wells was run by the Norfolk Shipwreck Association (NSA) and began in 1830 when an existing unnamed lifeboat that had been at Cromer was sent to Wells.

By the 1860s, there was no longer a lifeboat stationed at Wells, and the NSA operation had fallen into decline. At the same time, maritime incidents off the shores of North Norfolk were rising. In 1868 the residents of Wells partnered with the newly formed Royal National Lifeboat Institution (RNLI) to set up an organised lifeboat service in the town. The station officially opened in 1869 and was used until 1895, when the station was relocated to be closer to the open sea. The old boathouse is still standing; a Grade II listed building, it is used jointly as the Harbour Masters Office and a maritime museum.

1880s: Wells lifeboat disaster and Emma rescue 

On 29 October 1880, the 171-ton brig Ocean Queen was caught in a gale and sought shelter at Wells-next-the-Sea. At 1:00 pm, the Eliza Adams launched to the aid of another brig, the Sharon Rose, which had run ashore on the beach at nearby Holkham. Seven sailors were rescued and the lifeboat returned to Wells, where it discovered the Ocean Queen close to the harbour entrance, flying a distress flag. After a partial crew change, the Eliza Adams returned to sea to assist the Ocean Queen, which had been driven ashore nearby. The lifeboat was unable to assist and returned to port, but was swamped by a large wave en route and capsized; 11 of the lifeboat's 13 crewmen drowned. The crew of the Ocean Queen remained aboard their vessel, and were able to walk ashore once the storm had abated and the tide receded.

On 4 October 1883, a gale blew the schooner Emma of Jersey onto the East Bar near Wells, stranding her. Wells lifeboat  was launched to assist. The Emma was heavily damaged, so the Charlotte Nicholls took her five crewmen back to Wells.

1890s: new location 
By the 1890s, it had become evident that the location of the 1869 boathouse was problematic. At low water the lifeboat could not get out into the open sea and was overly reliant on the tide. In 1893, the lifeboat  was launched for three rescues, but arrived too late to provide actual assistance at any of them.

1930s–1970s: motor and inshore lifeboats 

Although motor lifeboats had been available since at least 1911, Wells was not provided with one until 1936 because of the need for an appropriate boat launch. She was also the first Surf-class to be propelled by a basic water jet system, which was ideal for the shallow water at Wells.

By the mid-1960s, the North Norfolk coast had seen an increased use of marine incidents resulting from pleasure boating and beachgoing. An inshore service was established in 1963 to alleviate the workload for the all-weather lifeboat  and decrease response times. 

Over 18 and 19 May 1963, the cabin cruiser Seamu had run aground at low tide at the entrance to Blakeney harbour. The Cecil Paine was launched to assist, arriving on scene at 10:50 pm. Seas were rough and winds were high. The coxswain made several attempts to approach, but sandbanks and high winds made it difficult. After four attempts, the two crewmen of the Seamu were finally taken aboard the Cecil Paine to safety. The coxswain was awarded an RNLI Bronze Medal.

Until 1976, the inshore service was provided by a series of unnamed  lifeboats. In January 1978 a severe storm destroyed the IRB house and damaged the doors to the main boathall. A new IRB house was built onto the side of the main station.

On the morning of 15 February 1979, gale force nine to ten winds were blowing blizzard conditions across the North Sea. Wells lifeboat Ernest Tom Neathercoat was launched to service that morning, but struggled to make headway through temperatures well below freezing and rough seas which eventually knocked out her radar, MF radio and echo-sounding systems. She eventually arrived and stood by the Savinesti for two hours until the arrival of the  lifeboat  out of Humber Lifeboat Station, which was to take over the service. By this point, the winds had increased to hurricane force 12, waves were up to 40 feet high, and it was still snowing heavily. At this time the Wells lifeboat was released from the service and sent back to Wells, arriving between 6:00 and 7:00 pm after approximately 11 hours at sea. The  coxswain was awarded an RNLI Silver Medal.

1980s–1990s: Station improvements and Mersey-class 

The 1895 beach road station has been improved and renovated on several occasions, but the bulk of the structure is still original. The crew facilities were expanded with an additional level in 1983, and a boathouse extension was added in 1986 to house the inshore lifeboat. 

In 1990 the station was allocated a new Mersey-class lifeboat, the Doris M. Mann of Ampthill, prompting significant alterations to the boathouse in order to accommodate it. The house had to be almost completely re-built whilst retaining the historic integrity of the 1895 structure. In the mid 1990s work was also carried out to combat coastal erosion on the sandy headland where the boat house is located. This was achieved by re-using greenheart timbers re-claimed after the demolition of the Eastbourne slipway. Extra new groynes were also installed to retain the beach in front of the station, vital for the continued beach launching of the lifeboats.

2020s: New Boathouse and Shannon-class 
Work on the construction of a new boathouse to the West of the existing boathouse which is more than 125 years old started in September 2020.  Completion is expected in 2022 to support the introduction of a new Shannon-class lifeboat, which was part funded by a successful local campaign in 2014-2015 and part by the Civil Service charity The Lifeboat Fund.  The Shannon-class to be based at Wells will be 13-46 Duke of Edinburgh which is set to arrive in Q3 2022.

Fleet

All-weather Boats

Inshore lifeboats

Auxiliary vehicles 
 Talus MB-H amphibious launch tractor (T-96)

Gallery

See also
List of RNLI stations

References 

Lifeboat stations in Norfolk
Lifeboat Station